The Shadwell forgeries, also known as the Shadwell Dock forgeries or the Billy and Charley forgeries were a series of mid-19th century forgeries of medieval lead and lead-alloy artefacts. The latter name derives from the two Londoners, William "Billy" Smith and Charles "Charley" Eaton, who were responsible for their large-scale manufacture between 1857 and 1870. At the time, some antiquarians were fooled by the forgeries, despite them being crudely made by two individuals with limited skill in metalworking and little knowledge of medieval art.

Today, Billy and Charleys are viewed as examples of naïve art. A number of museums hold collections of them and they are sought-after collectible items in their own right. They have been sold for prices equalling or exceeding the values of examples of the medieval originals they purported to be.  Because of this, modern fake Billy and Charleys are  reportedly in circulation.

William Smith and Charles Eaton
Little is known of the lives of William Smith (dates unknown) and Charles Eaton (c.1834–1870) except that when young they were mudlarks – individuals that made a small living by searching the mudflats of the River Thames at low-tide, seeking any item of value. They lived in Rosemary Lane (now called Royal Mint Street) in what is now part of the London Borough of Tower Hamlets.

In 1844 or 1845, Smith came into contact with an antique dealer, William Edwards; Eaton met Edwards some years later. Edwards came to view the pair as "his boys" and frequently bought from them items of interest they found while mudlarking. In 1857, the two began to manufacture counterfeit artefacts to sell to Edwards.

Forgeries

 
During their career, Smith and Eaton are estimated to have made between 5,000 and 10,000 items of many kinds, including pilgrim badges, ampulla, statuettes, portable shrines, coins, medallions and ornamental spearheads. Initially they were all made from lead or pewter, but later the two also used a copper-lead alloy. The items were cast using plaster of Paris moulds, into which a design was engraved by hand. They were then given the appearance of age by being bathed in acid and coated with river mud.

These had crude depictions of knights in armour, crowned kings or religious figures. They often carried inscriptions, but as Smith and Eaton were illiterate, these were meaningless. To give the appearance of age, many of the items also carried dates between the 11th century and the 16th century. However the dates were inscribed using Arabic numerals which only came into use in England during the 15th century and so are anachronistic on the "older" items.

Smith and Eaton sold their forgeries to Edwards, selling around 1100 items between 1857 and 1858 for a total of £200. The two claimed the source of the steady stream of antiquities was the large-scale excavations then taking place as part of the construction of Shadwell Dock. In June 1857, Edwards showed samples to another antique dealer, George Eastwood. Eastwood bought the 1100 items from Edwards, before bypassing him and buying further supplies directly from Smith and Eaton. Eastwood advertised them as a "A remarkable curious and unique collection of leaden signs or badges of the time of Richard II",. He sold them to several customers, including one person buying them on behalf of the British Museum.

Libel trial

By 1858, Henry Syer Cuming, the secretary of the British Archaeological Association, together with the archaeologist Thomas Bateman, had noticed the appearance of large numbers of medieval artefacts for sale which they suspected to be forgeries from a single source. On 28 April, Cuming delivered a lecture, Some Recent Forgeries in Lead, to the British Archaeological Association in which he condemned them as "Gross attempts at deception". The lecture was reported in The Gentleman's Magazine and The Athenaeum. George Eastwood responded firstly with a letter defending the authenticity of the items he was selling, and then by suing the publishers of The Athenaeum for libel. He had not been named in the magazine's report but he was the only seller of the items so his complaint was that the Athaenum had libelled him implicitly and damaged his business.

The trial was held at Guildford Assizes on 4 August 1858. The judge was Sir James Shaw Willes, Eastwood was represented by Edwin James QC. The Athenaeum was represented by Montague Chambers QC.

William Smith (described in a newspaper report as a "rough looking young man") was one of the witnesses. In his testimony, Smith claimed he had obtained them from the Shadwell Dock construction site, by bribing the navvies building the dock with money and drink, and by sneaking onto the site himself after hours. He testified he had sold around 2000 items, making around £400. Examples of the artefacts were presented to the courts as exhibits; according to The Times newspaper report, "a good deal of amusement was produced by the extraordinary nature of some of those that were produced".

Charles Roach Smith, a leading antiquarian and co-founder of the British Archaeological Association, testified to the authenticity of the Billy and Charleys. Before the trial, Roach-Smith had stated their very crudity was an argument for their authenticity – he assumed any 19th century forger intent on deception would simply have done a better job in making them. Under examination during the trial, he stated his belief that they were a previously unknown class of object with an unknown purpose. However, he was confident of their age. The Rev. Thomas Hugo, vicar of St Botolph-without-Bishopsgate, a fellow of the Society of Antiquaries and a published author on the subject, gave testimony that supported Roach-Smith, stating that the items dated from the 15th or 16th centuries. Although under cross-examination, he was unable to state exactly why he thought so. The artist and antiquary Frederick William Fairholt also testified that he believed them authentic, as did two other antique dealers.

The Athenaeum had not named George Eastwood in its report so the trial judge directed the jury to find the magazine publishers not-guilty of libel, but it was asked to affirm its faith in Eastwood's integrity.

Subsequent history
The libel trial attracted widespread publicity. Even though Eastwood failed to convict The Athenaeum of libel, the result gave the appearance of endorsing the authenticity of his stock, and his sales increased.

Roach-Smith reported on the trial in The Gentleman's Magazine, stating his theory the items were of 16th century origin. In 1861, he published volume five of his work, Collectanea antiqua. This included an article stating the items were crude, religious tokens, dating from the reign of Mary I of England, that had been imported from continental Europe as replacements for the devotional items destroyed during the English Reformation.
Ironically, earlier volumes of the Collectanea antiqua had been among the scholarly reference works used by Smith and Eaton when creating their fakes.

Meanwhile, the businessman, politician and antiquarian Charles Reed had renewed the investigation of the artefacts; although he may have been prompted by Roach-Smith's book. He made inquiries in the Shadwell Dock construction site, but could not find anyone that had sold items to Smith or Eaton. He gained the confidence of a tosher (one who scavenges in sewers), who confirmed that Smith and Eaton had been selling forgeries. He was introduced to Smith and Eaton, and gained their trust, but paid the tosher to break into their workshop and steal several of their moulds; these were exhibited at a meeting of the Society of Antiquaries of London in March 1861 as proof the items were fakes.

Later career of Smith and Eaton
Despite their exposure, Smith and Eaton continued to make and sell forgeries throughout the 1860s. They began using a lead-copper alloy known as cock metal and their work showed somewhat improved craftsmanship. But increasing awareness of their activities made it harder for them to sell their forgeries. In 1867 they were arrested in Windsor, Berkshire after a local clergyman recognised the items they were selling. In court, there was found to be insufficient evidence to prosecute and they were released.

Charley Eaton died in January 1870 of consumption. William Smith's last appearance in the historical record was in 1871, when he was attempting to sell a copy of a 13th-century lead jug. Nothing further is known of him.

Collections
Examples of Billy and Charleys are in the collections of the British Museum, the Victoria and Albert Museum and the Museum of London. Many are held by the Cuming Museum, which includes the personal collection of Henry Syer Cuming.

References

Archaeological forgeries
Archaeology of London